Mike E. Clark is an American producer and DJ. His discography consists of four mixtapes under his own name, as well as numerous production credits.

Albums

Mixtapes

Production credits

References

External links 
 Mike E. Clark at Discogs

 
Production discographies
Hip hop discographies